Gulin (古蔺县) is a county of Luzhou, Sichuan, China.

Gulin may refer to:

Gulin, Poland, village in Radom County, Masovian Voivodeship, in east-central Poland
Gulin Subdistrict (古林街道), Dagang District, Tianjin, China
Gulin, Ningbo (古林镇), town in Yinzhou District, Ningbo, Zhejiang, China
Gulin (surname)

See also
 Guling (disambiguation)